Suraj Mal Tomar (reign:1613–1618) was a Rajput ruler of Nurpur, Himachal Pradesh in India.
During a campaign to Kangra Fort, he rebelled against the Mughals, then he went into exile and died at Chamba.
His brother, Raja Jagat Singh, succeeded him as ruler of Nurpur.

References

17th-century Indian monarchs